Seuzach railway station is a railway station in the Swiss canton of Zurich and municipality of Seuzach. The station is located on the Winterthur to Etzwilen line.

The station is the terminus of Zurich S-Bahn service S11, from Aarau, and is an intermediate stop on the S29, which links Winterthur and Stein am Rhein.

References

Seuzach
Seuzach